Todd Dagenais is an American college volleyball coach, former player, and author. Dagenais is the current head coach of the UCF Knights women's volleyball team of the University of Central Florida. He previously served as an assistant head coach at USC and MSU.

Dagenais has released a series of book and DVD guides for volleyball.

In 2019, Dagenais was announced as an inductee into the Upper Peninsula Sports Hall of Fame in his native Michigan.

Coaching Record

<small>

References

Living people
American volleyball coaches
American men's volleyball players
Volleyball
Year of birth missing (living people)